Ramatam was a 1970s rock band featuring Mike Pinera on guitar and vocals, April Lawton on lead guitar, and, for a short time, Mitch Mitchell on drums.

Ramatam was notable for having Lawton, a female lead guitarist. Tom Dowd produced their self-titled debut album in 1972.  Pinera was known for his work with Blues Image ("Ride Captain Ride") and later Iron Butterfly. Mitchell had been a member of The Jimi Hendrix Experience. The group also included some former members of Janis Joplin's Big Brother and The Holding Company. Russ Smith was the bass player and co-writer on some of the tunes.

Ramatam performed at Concert 10 in Long Pond, PA with Emerson Lake & Palmer, Edgar Winter, Three Dog Night, The Faces and others in 1972.

Mitchell's departure came before the band released its second and final album, In April Came the Dawning of the Red Suns (1973). Pinera left the band after claiming Lawton, who wanted both Pinera and Mitchell out, wanted to turn Ramatam into the "April Lawton Band." Pinera and Mitchell departed from the band at that point, leaving the focus entirely on Lawton. Jimmy Walker replaced Mitchell at that point and they recorded their second album "In April Came the Dawning of the Red Suns" along with Tommy Sullivan on bass.  Shortly thereafter, the band fractured under the pressure of business and musical direction and broke up in 1974.

Discography
Ramatam (Atlantic Records, 1972) U.S. #182
In April Came the Dawning of the Red Suns (Atlantic, 1973)

References

External links
 Ramatam audio at www.aprillawton.com

American rock music groups